The 1985 Western Michigan Broncos football team represented Western Michigan University in the Mid-American Conference (MAC) during the 1985 NCAA Division I-A football season.  In their fourth season under head coach Jack Harbaugh, the Broncos compiled a 4–6–1 record (4–4–1 against MAC opponents), finished in a tie for fourth place in the MAC, and were outscored by their opponents, 212 to 182.  The team played its home games at Waldo Stadium in Kalamazoo, Michigan.

The team's statistical leaders included Chris Conklin with 1,574 passing yards, Lewis Howard with 819 rushing yards, and Paul Sorce with 567 receiving yards. Quarterback Chris Conklin, safety Sam Culbert, and linebacker John Offerdahl were the team captains. For the second consecutive year, Offerdahl received the team's most outstanding player award; he was also selected as the MAC defensive player of the year.

Schedule

References

Western Michigan
Western Michigan Broncos football seasons
Western Michigan Broncos football